Liberty High School (LHS) is a four-year public high school in Eldersburg in Carroll County, Maryland, United States at  5855 Bartholow Road. The principal of the school is Kenneth Goncz.

About the School
Liberty High School was established in 1980 in Eldersburg, Maryland as part of the Carroll County Public Schools system.

The school's first graduation ceremony was held in 1981.

Liberty High School's mascot is a lion. It is represented as an African lion; in comparison, Penn State College's mascot, the Nittany Lions, is shown as a mountain lion, a species native to the United States. The school's colors are the complementary colors royal blue and gold, or more accurately blue and yellow. The school motto is "Strive for Excellence".

As of 2022, Liberty has been ranked 14th in the state, and 696th in National Rankings for education. As of June 2014, Liberty High School is ranked 59th in Maryland in administering Advanced Placement (AP) and International Baccalaureate (IB) tests to students.

In addition, LHS has five pillars of excellence, which consist of: Academics, Arts, Athletics, Community, and Service.

Students
Liberty High School enrolls 1,002 students as of the 2021–2022 school year.

Faculty
Liberty High School currently has a faculty of 132 teachers and staff. Liberty's staff includes teachers that have worked at the school since its founding in 1980, and several teachers and staff that are graduates of the school.

Administration

Kenneth Goncz, Principal
Meghan Brown, Assistant Principal
Christopher Merson, Assistant Principal
Brian Tombs, Academic Facilitator
Ed DeVincent, Athletic Administrator

Departments

Administration
Business & Marketing 
English
ESOL
Family and Consumer Science
JROTC
Math
Performing & Visual Arts
Phys Ed & Health
School Nurse
Science
Social Studies
Special Education
Support Staff
Technology Education & Agriculture 
World Languages

Extracurricular activities
Liberty High School has a wide range of extracurricular activities and sports. Students are allowed to join as many clubs and sports as they wish, however are only permitted to be President (or equivalent) of a single club. Each club is sponsored by a member of the faculty who advises the club and helps direct its activities. Liberty High School is no longer the only school in Carroll County to host a robotics team, but has had the longest running robotics team in the county, since 2007.

Sports

Fall
Cheerleading 
Girls JV/Varsity
Cross-Country
Boys JV/Varsity
Girls JV/Varsity
Field Hockey
Girls JV/Varsity 
Football
Boys JV/Varsity 
Golf
JV/Varsity
Soccer
Boys JV/Varsity 
Girls JV/Varsity
Volleyball
Girls JV/Varsity 
Corollary Bocce Ball
Winter
Basketball
Boys JV/Varsity 
Girls JV/Varsity 
Cheerleading
JV/Varsity
Indoor Track and Field
Boys JV/Varsity
Girls JV/Varsity
Wrestling
Boys JV/Varsity
Bowling
Spring
Baseball
Boys JV/Varsity 
Lacrosse
Boys JV/Varsity 
Girls JV/Varsity 
Softball
Girls JV/Varsity 
Tennis
Boys JV/Varsity
Girls JV/Varsity
Outdoor Track & Field
Boys JV/Varsity
Girls JV/Varsity
Corollary Corn Toss

State championships
 Girls' Soccer: 1996
 Boys' Cross Country: 2003, 2004, 2005, 2015, 2016, 2017, 2018
 Girls' Cross Country: 2014, 2019

Clubs
As of the 2022-2023 school year there are 34 clubs and organizations offered at Liberty High School.

Robotics
FIRST Robotics Competition Team 2199, the Robo-Lions, is a student run team that was founded as a Liberty High School sports team in the fall of 2006 following the collapse of the county wide team, 1464. However, the current relationship between the school and the team is a loose affiliation, with no legal ties, and the team is now open for membership from anyone living in Carroll County, Maryland.

Affiliations
In 2011, parents and teachers formed the non-profit PIE3 to fund robotics programs throughout Carroll County.

In 2012, the Robo-Lions became a member of the Freedom Area Recreation Council.

Currently, the team is working with Carroll County Public Schools to create a legal partnership with the school district.

Public outreach
The team focuses not only on the robot, but also on public outreach to promote the growth of STEM in Carroll County. Currently, the team is mentoring 6 elementary and middle school age FIRST LEGO League robotics teams, and the Robo-Lions have run the regional FLL Regional Competition, the Roar of the Robots, for the past 4 years. Additionally, team members also volunteer at competitions for FLL, FTC, and FRC.

In 2012, the Robot-Lions started a summer Lego Fun Camp; students age 7-11 learn to work with the FLL technology to complete basic tasks, as well as engaging in other engineering related activities and crafts. Initially the team only offered one session, however in 2013 (their second year running the camp) the team expanded the sessions offered to 3 due to popular demand. The team also offers a mentor training session for parents and teachers interested in mentoring FLL teams.

Public outreach also extends to community events, such as elementary and middle school science fairs, public library events, craft fairs, the American Cancer Society's Freedom Area Relay for Life, and events coordinated through the Freedom Area Recreation Council.

Additionally, the team works with Liberty High School clubs and organizations, including the drama club and the special education classroom, Learning for Independence. In 2010 the team built a robotic lamp post for the drama club's production of The Lion the Witch and the Wardrobe; in 2011, the team constructed a robotic crocodile for the drama club's production of Peter Pan (the robot won a Cappie for best prop).

The Robo-Lions have also been featured on Fox 45 News, twice.

Competitions and awards
 2013: Entrepreneurship Award, Richmond Regional
 2013: Regional Chairman's Award, Chesapeake Regional (Quarterfinalists)
 2013: FIRST Championship

Marching band
The Liberty High School Marching Band is known as the "Lions' Pride". In the past three years, the marching band has scored in the top two of their Atlantic coast competition circuit, the Tournament of Bands.  The Lions' Pride marching band is currently an open class, Group 3 band, and is ranked first in its local Chapter 5 region of the TOB tournament area.  In addition, it hosts the highest-scoring Drum Major in the Atlantic Coast Championship of 2014.   
 
In the years of 2018 and 2019 the Lions Pride Band broke TOB history by being the first Maryland band to win the Atlantic Coast Championship (ACC) back to back. In 2018 the Lions Pride Band Won ACCs for the first time ever with a score of 98.0 and awards for high music, visual and, drum major.  Following up that season in 2019 for the first time in TOB history a Maryland band won the Atlantic Coast Championships back to back. They came away with a score of 96.2 and an award for high brass.

References

External links
US News and Worlds Reports on Liberty

A website profiling Liberty High
Sports schedules and scores
Athletic Boosters site
Robo-Lions Website
PIE3 Website
Liberty Drama Website
Liberty Music Website

Educational institutions established in 1980
Eldersburg, Maryland
Public high schools in Maryland
Liberty High School
1980 establishments in Maryland